Jonathan Michael Spector is an American academic working as the professor of learning technologies and the doctoral program coordinator at the University of North Texas He was previously professor of educational psychology of the University of Georgia and instructional systems at Florida State University.

Early life and education 
Spector was born in Pensacola, Florida. He earned a Bachelor of Science degree in international affairs from the United States Air Force Academy in 1967 and a PhD in philosophy from the University of Texas at Austin in 1978. 


Career
Spector's research focuses on intelligent support for instructional design, assessing learning in complex domains, and technology integration in education. He has authored over 150 publications in the field of educational technology, and edited the Handbook of Research on Educational Communications and Technology, and the Encyclopedia of Educational Technology. He has been a visiting professor at several universities in China, India, and Malaysia and was a Fulbright research scholar at the University of Bergen. He was a past president of the Association for Educational Communications and Technology.


Publications

See also
PALM Center

References

External links

Learning Technologies at the College of Information at the University of North Texas
College of Information at the University of North Texas

Living people
University of North Texas faculty
University of North Texas College of Information faculty
University of Texas at Austin alumni
People in educational technology
United States Air Force Academy alumni
People from Pensacola, Florida
University of Georgia faculty
Florida State University faculty
Educational researchers
University of Bergen alumni
Year of birth missing (living people)